Tomopleura tricincta is a species of sea snail, a marine gastropod mollusk in the family Borsoniidae.

Description
The length of the shell varies between 13.7 mm and 18.7 mm.

Distribution
This marine species occurs in the Atlantic Ocean off West Africa and Angola.

References

  Gofas S. & Rolán E. (2009) A systematic review of "Asthenotoma spiralis (Smith, 1872)" in West Africa, with description of two new species (Mollusca, Gastropoda, Conoidea). Zoosystema 31: 5–16
 Ardovini R. & Cossignani T. 2004. — West African Seashells. L’Informatore Piceno, Ancona, 319 p

External links
 

tricincta
Gastropods described in 2009